Chandler is a ghost town in Cymri Rural Municipality, Saskatchewan, Canada. The site was on the Canadian Northern Railway line from Lampman to Radville.  The site only had a train station that served the town of Midale two miles to the north by horse drawn stage coach.  The Chandler town site was abandoned by the railway in 1927, and the rail-line abandoned in 1951.

See also 
 List of communities in Saskatchewan
 Hamlets of Saskatchewan
 List of ghost towns in Canada
 Ghost towns in Saskatchewan

References

Cymri No. 36, Saskatchewan
Unincorporated communities in Saskatchewan
Ghost towns in Saskatchewan
Division No. 2, Saskatchewan